Technocracy is a form of government in which the decision-maker or makers are selected based on their expertise in a given area of responsibility, particularly with regard to scientific or technical knowledge. This system explicitly contrasts with representative democracy, the notion that elected representatives should be the primary decision-makers in government, though it does not necessarily imply eliminating elected representatives. Decision-makers are selected based on specialized knowledge and performance rather than political affiliations, parliamentary skills, or popularity.

The term technocracy was initially used to signify the application of the scientific method to solving social problems. In its most extreme form, technocracy is an entire government running as a technical or engineering problem and is mostly hypothetical. In more practical use, technocracy is any portion of a bureaucracy run by technologists. A government in which elected officials appoint experts and professionals to administer individual government functions, and recommend legislation, can be considered technocratic. Some uses of the word refer to a form of meritocracy, where the ablest are in charge, ostensibly without the influence of special interest groups. Critics have suggested that a "technocratic divide" challenges more participatory models of democracy, describing these divides as "efficacy gaps that persist between governing bodies employing technocratic principles and members of the general public aiming to contribute to government decision making".

History of the term
The term technocracy is derived from the Greek words τέχνη, tekhne meaning skill and κράτος, kratos meaning power, as in governance, or rule. William Henry Smyth, a California engineer, is usually credited with inventing the word technocracy in 1919 to describe "the rule of the people made effective through the agency of their servants, the scientists and engineers", although the word had been used before on several occasions. Smyth used the term Technocracy in his 1919 article "'Technocracy'—Ways and Means to Gain Industrial Democracy" in the journal Industrial Management (57). Smyth's usage referred to Industrial democracy: a movement to integrate workers into decision-making through existing firms or revolution.

In the 1930s, through the influence of Howard Scott and the technocracy movement he founded, the term technocracy came to mean 'government by technical decision making', using an energy metric of value. Scott proposed that money be replaced by energy certificates denominated in units such as ergs or joules, equivalent in total amount to an appropriate national net energy budget, and then distributed equally among the North American population, according to resource availability.

There is in common usage found the derivative term technocrat. The word technocrat can refer to someone exercising governmental authority because of their knowledge, "a member of a powerful technical elite", or "someone who advocates the supremacy of technical experts". McDonnell and Valbruzzi define a prime minister or minister as a technocrat if "at the time of their appointment to government, they: have never held public office under the banner of a political party; are not a formal member of any party; and are said to possess recognized non-party political expertise which is directly relevant to the role occupied in government". In Russia, the President of Russia has often nominated ministers based on technical expertise from outside political circles, and these have been referred to as "technocrats".

Precursors
Before the term technocracy was coined, technocratic or quasi-technocratic ideas involving governance by technical experts were promoted by various individuals, most notably early socialist theorists such as Henri de Saint-Simon. This was expressed by the belief in state ownership over the economy, with the state's function being transformed from pure philosophical rule over men into a scientific administration of things and a direction of production processes under scientific management.  According to Daniel Bell:
"St. Simon's vision of industrial society, a vision of pure technocracy, was a system of planning and rational order in which society would specify its needs and organize the factors of production to achieve them."  Citing the ideas of St. Simon, Bell concludes that the "administration of things" by rational judgment is the hallmark of technocracy.

Alexander Bogdanov, a Russian scientist and social theorist, also anticipated a conception of technocratic process. Both Bogdanov's fiction and his political writings, which were highly influential, suggest that he expected a coming revolution against capitalism to lead to a technocratic society.

From 1913 until 1922, Bogdanov immersed himself in writing a lengthy philosophical treatise of original ideas, Tectology: Universal Organization Science. Tectology anticipated many basic ideas of systems analysis, later explored by cybernetics. In Tectology, Bogdanov proposed unifying all social, biological, and physical sciences by considering them as systems of relationships and seeking organizational principles that underlie all systems.

Arguably, the Platonic idea of philosopher-kings represents a sort of technocracy in which the state is run by those with specialist knowledge, in this case, knowledge of the Good rather than scientific knowledge. The Platonic claim is that those who best understand goodness should be empowered to lead the state, as they would lead it toward the path of happiness. Whilst knowledge of the Good differs from knowledge of science, rulers are here appointed based on a certain grasp of technical skill rather than democratic mandate.

Characteristics
Technocrats are individuals with technical training and occupations who perceive many important societal problems as being solvable with the applied use of technology and related applications. The administrative scientist Gunnar K. A. Njalsson theorizes that technocrats are primarily driven by their cognitive "problem-solution mindsets" and only in part by particular occupational group interests. Their activities and the increasing success of their ideas are thought to be a crucial factor behind the modern spread of technology and the largely ideological concept of the "information society". Technocrats may be distinguished from "econocrats" and "bureaucrats" whose problem-solution mindsets differ from those of the technocrats.

Examples
In 2013, a European Union library briefing on its legislative structure referred to the Commission as a "technocratic authority", holding a "legislative monopoly" over the EU lawmaking process. The briefing suggests that this system, which elevates the European Parliament to a vetoing and amending body, was "originally rooted in the mistrust of the political process in post-war Europe". This system is unusual since the Commission's sole right of legislative initiative is a power usually associated with Parliaments.

The former government of the Soviet Union has been referred to as a technocracy. Soviet leaders like Leonid Brezhnev often had a technical background. In 1986, 89% of Politburo members were engineers.

Leaders of the Chinese Communist Party used to be mostly professional engineers. According to surveys of municipal governments of cities with a population of 1 million or more in China, it has been found that over 80% of government personnel had a technical education. Under the five-year plans of the People's Republic of China, projects such as the National Trunk Highway System, the China high-speed rail system, and the Three Gorges Dam have been completed. During China's 20th National Congress, a class of technocrats in finance and economics are replaced in favor of high-tech technocrats.

Several governments in European parliamentary democracies have been labelled 'technocratic' based on the participation of unelected experts ('technocrats') in prominent positions. Since the 1990s, Italy has had several such governments (in Italian, governo tecnico) in times of economic or political crisis, including the formation in which economist Mario Monti presided over a cabinet of unelected professionals. The term 'technocratic' has been applied to governments where a cabinet of elected professional politicians is led by an unelected prime minister, such as in the cases of the 2011-2012 Greek government led by economist Lucas Papademos and the Czech Republic's 2009–2010 caretaker government presided over by the state's chief statistician, Jan Fischer. In December 2013, in the framework of the national dialogue facilitated by the Tunisian National Dialogue Quartet, political parties in Tunisia agreed to install a technocratic government led by Mehdi Jomaa.

The article "Technocrats: Minds Like Machines" states that Singapore is perhaps the best advertisement for technocracy: the political and expert components of the governing system there seem to have merged completely. This was underlined in a 1993 article in "Wired" by Sandy Sandfort, where he describes the information technology system of the island even at that early date making it effectively intelligent.

Engineering
Following Samuel Haber, Donald Stabile argues that engineers were faced with a conflict between physical efficiency and cost efficiency in the new corporate capitalist enterprises of the late nineteenth-century United States. Because of their perceptions of market demand, the profit-conscious, non-technical managers of firms where the engineers work often impose limits on the projects that engineers desire to undertake.

The prices of all inputs vary with market forces, thereby upsetting the engineer's careful calculations. As a result, the engineer loses control over projects and must continually revise plans. To maintain control over projects, the engineer must attempt to control these outside variables and transform them into constant factors.

Technocracy movement

The American economist and sociologist Thorstein Veblen was an early advocate of technocracy and was involved in the Technical Alliance, as were Howard Scott and M. King Hubbert (the latter of whom later developed the theory of peak oil). Veblen believed technological developments would eventually lead to a socialistic reorganization of economic affairs. Veblen saw socialism as one intermediate phase in an ongoing evolutionary process in society that would be brought about by the natural decay of the business enterprise system and the rise of the engineers. Daniel Bell sees an affinity between Veblen and the Technocracy movement.

In 1932, Howard Scott and Marion King Hubbert founded Technocracy Incorporated and proposed that money be replaced by energy certificates. The group argued that apolitical, rational engineers should be vested with the authority to guide an economy into a thermodynamically balanced load of production and consumption, thereby doing away with unemployment and debt.

The technocracy movement was briefly popular in the US in the early 1930s during the Great Depression. By the mid-1930s, interest in the movement was declining. Some historians have attributed the decline to the rise of Roosevelt's New Deal.

Historian William E. Akin rejects this conclusion. Instead, Akin argues that the movement declined in the mid-1930s due to the technocrats' failure to devise a 'viable political theory for achieving change'. Akin postulates that many technocrats remained vocal, dissatisfied, and often sympathetic to anti-New Deal third-party efforts.

Critiques
Critics have suggested that a "technocratic divide" exists between a governing body controlled to varying extents by technocrats and members of the general public. Technocratic divides are "efficacy gaps that persist between governing bodies employing technocratic principles and members of the general public aiming to contribute to government decision making". Technocracy privileges the opinions and viewpoints of technical experts, exalting them into a kind of aristocracy while marginalizing the opinions and viewpoints of the general public.

As major multinational technology corporations (e.g., FAANG) swell market caps and customer counts, critiques of technocratic government in the 21st century see its manifestation in American politics not as an "authoritarian nightmare of oppression and violence" but rather as an éminence grise: a democratic cabal directed by Mark Zuckerberg and the entire cohort of "Big Tech" executives. It is not explained how Mark Zuckerberg or other big tech corporate heads (who are not elected by the people) can form a "democratic" cabal. In his 1982 Technology and Culture journal article, "The Technocratic Image and the Theory of Technocracy", John G. Gunnell presciently writes: "...politics is increasingly subject to the influence of technological change", with specific reference to the advent of The Long Boom and the genesis of the Internet, following the 1973-1975 Recession. Gunnel goes on to add three levels of analysis that delineate technology's political influence:

 "Political power tends to gravitate towards technological elites".
 "Technology has become autonomous" and thus impenetrable by political structures.
 "Technology (and science) constitute a new legitimizing ideology", as well as triumphing over "tribalism, nationalism, the crusading spirit in religion, bigotry, censorship, racism, persecution, immigration and emigration restrictions, tariffs, and chauvinism".

In each of the three analytical levels, Gunnell foretells technology's infiltration of political processes and suggests that the entanglement of the two (i.e. technology and politics) will inevitably produce power concentrations around those with advanced technological training, namely the technocrats. Forty years after the publication of Gunnell's writings, technology and government have become, for better or for worse, increasingly intertwined. Facebook can be considered a technocratic microcosm, a "technocratic nation-state" with a cyberspatial population that surpasses any terrestrial nation. In a broader sense, critics fear that the rise of social media networks (e.g. Twitter, YouTube, Instagram, Pinterest), coupled with the "decline in mainstream engagement", imperil the "networked young citizen" to inconspicuous coercion and indoctrination by algorithmic mechanisms, and, less insidiously, to the persuasion of particular candidates based predominantly on "Social Media engagement".

In a 2022 article published in Boston Review, political scientist Matthew Cole highlights two problems with technocracy: that it creates "unjust concentrations of power" and relies on a "flawed theory of knowledge." With respect to the first point, Cole argues that technocracy excludes citizens from policy-making processes while advantaging elites. With respect to the second, he argues that the value of expertise is overestimated in technocratic systems, and points to an alternative concept of "smart democracy" which enlists the knowledge of ordinary citizens.

See also
Bright green environmentalism
Continentalism
Cyberocracy, a hypothetical form of government that rules by the effective use of information
Groupe X-Crise, formed by French former students of the Ecole Polytechnique engineer school in the 1930s
Imperial examination, an examination system in Imperial China designed to select the best administrative officials for the state's bureaucracy
Positivism
Post-politics
Post-scarcity economy
Project Cybersyn
Redressement Français, a French technocratic movement founded by Ernest Mercier in 1925
Scientism
Scientocracy, the practice of basing public policies on science
Techno-populism
Thermoeconomics
Player Piano, Kurt Vonnegut's speculative fiction novel describing a technocratic society
The Revolt of the Masses, a book by José Ortega y Gasset containing a critique of technocracy
Wealth, Virtual Wealth and Debt,  a book by Nobel prize-winning chemist Frederick Soddy on monetary policy and society and the role of energy in economic systems

References

External links

 
 William Henry Smyth, Technocracy Parts I-IV., Working Explosively, A Protest Against Mechanistic Efficiency.  Working Explosively Versus Working Efficiently. at archive.org 
 William Henry Smyth, Technocracy Part I., Human Instincts in Reconstruction: An Analysis of Urges and Suggestions for Their Direction., 
 William Henry Smyth, Technocracy Part II., National Industrial Management: Practical Suggestions for National Reconstruction., 
 William Henry Smyth, Technocracy Part III., "Technocracy" - Ways and Means To Gain Industrial Democracy., 
 William Henry Smyth, Technocracy Part IV., Skill Economics for Industrial Democracy., go to page 9 of 38
 
 Marion King Hubbert, Howard Scott, Technocracy Inc., Technocracy Study Course Unabridged, New York, 1st Edition, 1934; 5th Edition, 1940, 4th printing, July 1945.
 Stuart Chase, Technocracy: An Interpretation 
 Technocracy and Socialism, by Paul Blanshard.

Oligarchy
Politics and technology
Technocracy movement
Technology systems
Management cybernetics